Saturday's Children is a 1940 American drama film directed by Vincent Sherman and starring John Garfield, Anne Shirley, and Claude Rains. It is a third-time remake of the original Maxwell Anderson play with a previous version released in 1935 under the title Maybe It's Love.

Plot
Twenty-two-year-old Bobby Halevy (Anne Shirley) falls in love with her fellow employee, Rims Rosson (John Garfield). Rosson is an idealistic dreamer and would-be inventor whose get-rich scheme is going off to Manila to turn hemp into silk. Their romance flourishes until Bobby is talked into tricking Rims into marriage. Living poor and on the verge of breaking up, the couple realizes that there is more to life than having a lot of money.

Cast
 John Garfield as Rims Rosson
 Anne Shirley as Bobby Halevy
 Claude Rains as Mr. Halevy
 Lee Patrick as Florrie Sands
 George Tobias as Herbie Smith
 Roscoe Karns as Willie Sands
 Dennie Moore as Gertrude Mills
 Elizabeth Risdon as Mrs. Halevy
 Berton Churchill as Mr. Norman
 Lucile Fairbanks as a nurse (uncredited)
 John Qualen as first carpenter (uncredited)

Production
Warners originally cast Priscilla Lane in the lead but Garfield was sure that the Lane Sisters would somehow have to be written in as well. He used his influence to get the studio to borrow Shirley from RKO. Julius Epstein thought Garfield's performance was the closest he came to playing his real self. Usually discontented with the way he was typecast by the studio, Garfield was unusually proud of his restrained characterization.

Radio adaptation
Saturday's Children was presented on Screen Guild Players June 2, 1947. The 30-minute adaptation starred Garfield and Jane Wyman.

References

External links 
 
 
 
 

1940 films
1940 drama films
American black-and-white films
American drama films
American films based on plays
1940s English-language films
Films directed by Vincent Sherman
Films scored by Adolph Deutsch
Warner Bros. films
1940s American films